University of Primorska (Slovenian Univerza na Primorskem, Italian Università del Litorale) is by age and size the third university in Slovenia. It is located in Koper, Izola, and Portorož and is named for the Slovenian Littoral region (Slovenian Primorska), where it is located.

History
The very first efforts to found a Slovenian university in the Littoral were made almost one hundred years ago, whereas the first concrete steps towards the establishment of a new Slovene university were taken after the country had become independent. Thus 1992 saw the preparation of the expert study of the development of higher education in the Littoral, and a year later a letter of intent was signed envisioning the establishment of the University Study Centre. In 1995, the Slovene Science and Research Centre was founded in order to garner the intellectual potential of the future university, while 1996 witnessed the formation of the University Study Centre of Koper, which facilitated the development of higher education in the region and prepared the legal basis for founding the university. Two years later, the letter of intent was also signed by representatives of the regional economic sector and by regional chambers of commerce.

Finally, on 29 January 2003, the Slovene Parliament passed the University of Primorska Charter. Two months later, on 17 March 2003, the University of Primorska was entered into the register of legal entities kept by the District Court of Koper. The newly established university comprised three faculties, two colleges, and two research institutes.

Rectors

 Lucija Čok (2003–2007)
 Rado Bohinc (2007–2011)
 Dragan Marušič (2011–2019)
 Klavdija Kutnar (2019–present)

Organization
The university is divided into six faculties and one college:
Faculty of Education, Koper
Faculty of Humanities, Koper
Faculty of Management, Koper
Faculty of Mathematics, Natural Sciences and Information technologies - Koper
Faculty of Tourism Studies, Portorož
Faculty of Health Care, Izola
College of Design, Ljubljana

One institute is also part of the University of Primorska: the Andrej Marušič Institute.

Other universities in Slovenia
 University of Ljubljana
 University of Maribor
 University of Nova Gorica

References

External links 
 University of Primorska Website 

 
Educational institutions established in 2003
Universities in Slovenia
Koper
2003 establishments in Slovenia